Birte Weiss (born 1 May 1941) is a Danish journalist and social democrat politician, who served in various capacities in the government of Denmark. She works as a journalist for the newspaper Weekendavisen.

Early life and education
Weiss was born on 1 May 1941. She was trained as a journalist with the social democrat press from 1960 to 1963. Later she attended the University of Copenhagen and studied there comparative literature.

Career
Weiss began her career as a journalist, working for Demokraten and then for Information. Next she involved in politics and became a member of the Danish Parliament for the Social Democrats for two terms; from 1971 to 1973 and from 1975 to 2001. She was the chairperson of the council of Denmark’s Radio/TV from 1981 to 1986. She served as the deputy chairperson of the social democrats from 1994 to 1996 and first vice-chairperson of the Parliament from 1998 to 1999.

She assumed various cabinet positions. Her first ministerial post was the minister of interior, and she served in the office from 1993 to 1997. She resigned from the post on 20 October, and Thorkild Simonsen succeeded her in the post. She was also the minister of church affairs which she held from 1994 to 1996. She was appointed minister of health in 1996, and her tenure lasted until 1998. Lastly she served as the minister of research and information technology from 1999 to 2001.

Activities
When she was the interior minister Weiss delivered a bill in 1996, stating that a foreigner, who is guilty of drug-related crime, should be deported from Denmark. A documentary, En minister krydser sit spor (Danish: A Minister Backtracks), filmed by Danish director Ulrik Holmstrup in 2000 is about her activities as interior minister. It narrates the dilemma she faced in dealing with Bosnian refugees in the country.

Personal life
Weiss is married and has two sons.

References

20th-century Danish journalists
21st-century Danish journalists
1941 births
Danish Health Ministers
Danish Interior Ministers
Danish women journalists
Female interior ministers
Living people
Members of the Folketing 1971–1973
Members of the Folketing 1975–1977
Members of the Folketing 1977–1979
Members of the Folketing 1979–1981
Members of the Folketing 1981–1984
Members of the Folketing 1987–1988
Members of the Folketing 1988–1990
Members of the Folketing 1990–1994
Members of the Folketing 1994–1998
Members of the Folketing 1998–2001
Social Democrats (Denmark) politicians
Women government ministers of Denmark
Women members of the Folketing
Weekendavisen people
University of Copenhagen alumni
Danish Ministers of Higher Education and Science